Nzulu is a commune in the city of Zongo in the Democratic Republic of Congo.

References 

Populated places in the province of Équateur
Communes of the Democratic Republic of the Congo